Gnaeus Servilius Caepio may refer to a number of Roman consuls or senators:

 Gnaeus Servilius Caepio (consul 253 BC)
 Gnaeus Servilius Caepio (consul 203 BC)
 Gnaeus Servilius Caepio (consul 169 BC)
 Gnaeus Servilius Caepio (consul 141 BC), censor in 125 BC
 Gnaeus Servilius Caepio (quaestor 105 BC)
 Gnaeus Servilius Caepio (brother of Cato)